Meshack Kondwani is a retired boxer from Zimbabwe.  Kondwani lost to Nicky Cook for the Commonwealth featherweight title.  Kondwani also lost to Paulus Moses for the World Boxing Association Pan African featherweight title.
His hometown is Harare.

References

1974 births
Living people
Sportspeople from Harare
Featherweight boxers
Zimbabwean male boxers